Grayson Dupont (born January 16, 1998) is an American professional soccer player who plays as a midfielder for Birmingham Legion in the USL Championship.

Early life

Youth, college & amateur
Dupont attended the Montverde Academy. During his time at Montverde, he won a high school national championship in 2016. 

In 2016, Dupont attended the University of New Mexico to play college soccer. He redshirted his freshman season, later going on to make 17 appearances and scoring a single goal for the Lobos. In 2019, Dupont transferred to the University of Alabama at Birmingham, making 25 appearances, scoring three goals and tallying two assists. He was named to C-USA All-Conference Third Team in 2020–21 and Commissioner’s Academic Honor Roll on two consecutive occasions.

While at college, Dupont appeared in the USL League Two for Brazos Valley Cavalry in 2018 and 2019.

Club career
In 2021, Dupont played in Spain with sixth-tier side C.D. Almuñécar City, making five appearances.

On March 30, 2022, Dupont returned to the United States, signing with USL Championship club Birmingham Legion. He made his debut on April 10, 2022, appearing as an injury-time substitute during a 2–1 win over Hartford Athletic.

References

1998 births
American expatriate soccer players
American expatriate sportspeople in Spain
American soccer players
Association football midfielders
Birmingham Legion FC players
Brazos Valley Cavalry FC players
Expatriate footballers in Spain
Living people
Montverde Academy alumni
New Mexico Lobos men's soccer players
Soccer players from Alabama
Soccer players from Birmingham, Alabama
Sportspeople from Birmingham, Alabama
UAB Blazers men's soccer players
USL Championship players
USL League Two players